The World RX of Portugal is a rallycross event held in Portugal that formed part of the FIA World Rallycross Championship between 2014 and 2018. The event made its debut in the championship's inaugural 2014 season, at the Pista Automóvel de Montalegre in the northern town of Montalegre, close to the Spanish border. It was removed from the series calendar ahead of the 2019 season, marking the first time in the championship's history that the event was not run. The event was set to return in 2020 but was later cancelled due to the COVID-19 pandemic. On 12 May 2021; it was announced that the event will return in 2021 instead of the World RX of Norway as the final round of the calendar. For 2022 season Montalegre’s layout has been re-profiled, with the old joker lap now the first corner and a new, gravel joker from Turns Two to Five.

Past winners

See also
Rally de Portugal - event held as part of the World Rally Championship
Portuguese Grand Prix – event held as part of the Formula One World Championship
WTCR Race of Portugal – event held as part of the World Touring Car Championship and the World Touring Car Cup

References

External links 
Circuito Internacional de Montalegre

Portugal
Auto races in Portugal